Brainlove Records was a British independent record label with a DIY ethic, based in London, England. The label released experimental indie, pop and electronic music.

Brainlove Records received positive press from media sources such as NME ("relentlessly brilliant"), BBC Radio 1 and BBC 6 Music. 
Brainlove also ran live shows, including showcases at SPOT Festival in Denmark and Iceland Airwaves in Reykjavik, as well as club nights with White Heat, Club NME at Koko and La Route Du Rock, and a two-day label music festival, held annually at the Brixton Windmill.

The label published an article on its early history in The Quietus in August 2010.

Roster of artists

Albums & EP Releases
Applicants
Bastardgeist
Bishi
Bleeding Heart Narrative
David Thomas Broughton
The Evenings
Formula Bone
Keyboard Choir
Kippi Kaninus 
Mat Riviere
Napoleon IIIrd
The Open Mouths
Pagan Wanderer Lu/Andrew Paul Regan
The Pale Horse
Sacred Harp
Stairs To Korea
We Aeronauts

Compilation, Single and 7" Club Releases
The $hit, A Scholar & A Physician, Ace Bushy Striptease, Anat Ben David (of Chicks On Speed), Bearsuit, The Blitters, Capitol K, Cats In Paris, Copter, Curly Hair, End Of Level Boss, Ex-Rental, Fidel Villeneuve, Fosca, Friends of the Bride, gay against you, Internet Forever, Junkplanet, Kid Carpet, Micronormous, Misty's Big Adventure, Modernaire, Nervoustestpilot, Penny Broadhurst, Planningtorock, Pram, Retro Spankees, Shimura Curves, Slag Rabbit, The Telescopes, Tim Ten Yen, Trash Fashion, Vicki Churchill, What The Moon Is Like.

See also
 List of record labels

References

External links
 

Record labels established in 2003
British independent record labels
Indie pop record labels